Stigmella nigriverticella is a moth of the family Nepticulidae. It is found in Texas, Cincinnati, Ohio, New York, Arkansas, Pennsylvania and Kentucky in the United States.

The wingspan is 4.4-5.2 mm. There are probably three generations per year.

Specimens have been taken on the trunk of wild cherry but there is no other evidence to verify that this is the host plant.

External links
Nepticulidae of North America
A taxonomic revision of the North American species of Stigmella (Lepidoptera: Nepticulidae)

Nepticulidae
Moths of North America
Moths described in 1875